Nurdles are tiny pre-production plastic pellets (smaller than 5mm) that are universally used in the plastics industry for the manufacture of plastic products. These microplastics are made primarily from polyethylene, polypropylene, polystyrene, polyvinyl chloride, and other plastics or synthetic resins. Nurdles are the building block, via plastic extrusion or injection molding, for items for everyday life including plastic water bottles, containers, and bags.

Impact on the environment 

These plastics can be seen washing up on shorelines of rivers, beaches, and lakes across the world. The earliest date that nurdles recorded being seen on beaches was around the 1970s but have been recorded as being used earlier around the 1940s and 50s. The pellets find their way into the ocean in a multitude of ways, including accidental spills in transport, and move quickly as they are small enough to be blown around by wind and also float on water. As nurdles stay out in the world they continue to break down and get even smaller than previously recorded.

Ecosystems 
Nurdles can disrupt many ecosystems, as some birds and fish may confuse these plastic pieces for their food and can end up starving because of how much plastic they have eaten. Nurdles can absorb toxins and other harmful chemicals, known as persistent organic pollutants (POPs), that can be eaten by fish, which can poison them or get caught for human consumption. Biofilms can also form on nurdles that hold pathogens harmful to people.

See also
Pelletizing

References

External links

Plastics industry blamed for 'nurdles' found in Christchurch estuary

Plastics industry